Sibusiso Blessing Sibeko (born 24 March 1995) is a South African soccer player who plays for Marumo Gallants, as a midfielder.

Club career
Sibeko was born in Durban. He was released by Lamontville Golden Arrows in 2020. He subsequently signed for National First Division side Polokwane City in November 2020.

International career
He was part of the South Africa under-23 squad for the 2015 Africa U-23 Cup of Nations, but did not appear in any of their matches.

References

1995 births
Living people
South African soccer players
Association football midfielders
Lamontville Golden Arrows F.C. players
Polokwane City F.C. players
Marumo Gallants F.C. players
South African Premier Division players
National First Division players